William David McIntyre  (4 September 1932 – 11 September 2022) was a British-born New Zealand historian, known for his expertise on the military and constitutional histories of the Commonwealth of Nations and British Empire.

Early life and family
Born in England on 4 September 1932, McIntyre was the son of Rev. J. McIntyre, a congregationalist minister. He was educated at Caterham School and went on to study at Peterhouse, Cambridge, and Washington University, earning a Master of Arts degree, and the School of Oriental & African Studies at the University of London, where he completed a PhD. His 1959 doctoral thesis was titled British policy in west Africa, the Malay peninsula and the south Pacific during the secretaryships of Lord Kimberley and Lord Carnarvon 1870–1876. 

In 1957, McIntyre married Marion Jean Hillyard, an American he met while at Washington University, and they went on to have five children.

Career
McIntyre was a teaching fellow at Washington University from 1955 to 1956. After completing his PhD, in 1959 he became an assistant lecturer, and later lecturer, in Commonwealth and American history at the University of Nottingham. In 1966, he was appointed a professor in history at the University of Canterbury, in Christchurch, New Zealand, where he remained for the rest of his career. He retired in 1997, and was awarded the title of professor emeritus. He continued to write and research. An expert on the constitutional and military histories of the Commonwealth of Nations and British Empire, McIntyre published and advised governments. He served as consultant to the Committee on Commonwealth Membership, and compiled its report which was accepted by Heads of Government at Kampala in 2007.

In the 1992 Queen's Birthday Honours, McIntyre was appointed an Officer of the Order of the British Empire, for services to historical research.

Later life and death
McIntyre married his second wife in 1993. He died in Lower Hutt on 11 September 2022, aged 90 years

Works

Books written
1966: Colonies into Commonwealth
1967: The Imperial Frontier in the Tropics, 1865–75
1969: Neutrality, Non-alignment, and New Zealand
1969: Britain, New Zealand and the Security of South-East Asia in the 1970s
1970: Britain and the Commonwealth since 1907
1973: The Commonwealth: Its past, present, and future
1977: The Commonwealth of Nations: Origins and impact, 1869–1971
1979: The Rise and Fall of Singapore Naval Base, 1919–42
1988: New Zealand Prepares for War: Defence Policy 1919–39
1991: The Significance of the Commonwealth, 1965-90
1995: Background to the ANZUS Pact: Policy-making, strategy, and diplomacy, 1945–55
1998: British Decolonization, 1946–1997: When, why, and how did the British Empire fall?
2001: A Guide to the Contemporary Commonwealth 
2002: When, if ever, did New Zealand become Independent?
2006: Shifting starr: A Presbyterian drama: St Andrew's at Rangi Ruru 1956-2006
2007: Dominion of New Zealand: Statesmen and status, 1907-1945
2009: The Britannic vision: historians and the making of the British Commonwealth of nations, 1907-48 
2014: Winding up the British Empire in the Pacific Islands

Books edited
1971: Speeches and Documents on New Zealand History
1980: The Journal of Henry Sewell, 1853–7

References

1932 births
2022 deaths
People educated at Caterham School
Alumni of Peterhouse, Cambridge
Washington University in St. Louis alumni
Alumni of SOAS University of London
Academics of the University of Nottingham
20th-century British historians
20th-century New Zealand historians
Commonwealth of Nations experts
British emigrants to New Zealand
Academic staff of the University of Canterbury
New Zealand Officers of the Order of the British Empire
21st-century New Zealand historians
Washington University in St. Louis fellows